Genevieve Sterling Buechner (born November 10, 1991) is a Canadian actress. She is known for her television roles such as Tamara Adama on the Syfy series Caprica, Fox on The CW series The 100, and Madison on the Lifetime series UnREAL.

Early life 
Genevieve Buechner was born in Edmonton, Alberta, to single mother Tea Buechner. Her stepfather is folk musician Geoff Berner. When her family moved to Vancouver, she took a small course in acting from the Vancouver Youth Theatre. After completing the course, she went on tour with the youth theater as the youngest member of the cast. She was scouted by Robert Carrier and signed to Carrier Talent Management in Vancouver.

Career 
At age ten Buechner got the lead role in a Toronto film production Saint Monica. The film went on to be a festival success playing across North America and being selected for the Berlin Film Festival, the Atlantic Film Festival, the Toronto Film Festival and the Vancouver Film Festival. She was nominated for a Canadian Leo Award for Best Lead performance by a female in 2003 for that role.

In 2005, Buechner played the daughter of Brooke Shields in the Tom Green-led film Bob the Butler. She followed this up in 2007 with a role in the Canadian drama film Mount Pleasant.

Buechner has notable recurring roles on the television series Caprica, The 100, and UnREAL.

In 2015, Buechner played the lead role of Annie Emmerson in the Lifetime television film Jim Henson's Turkey Hollow.

Personal life 
In a 2018 interview with AfterEllen, Buechner revealed that she is bisexual.

Filmography

Film

Television

Awards

References

External links

1991 births
Actresses from Edmonton
Bisexual actresses
Bisexual women
Canadian child actresses
Canadian film actresses
Canadian television actresses
Living people
Canadian LGBT actors